Justin Lee Hutson (born October 16, 1971) is an American college basketball coach who is the current head coach of the Fresno State Bulldogs men's basketball team.

Playing career
Hutson began his college basketball career at two junior colleges, first Bakersfield College in 1989–90 then Ventura College from 1990 to 1992. From 1992 to 1994, Hutson played at Cal State Bakersfield, which was NCAA Division II at the time. Hutson was a member of the Roadrunners' 
1993 NCAA Championship and 1994 NCAA Championship squads.

Coaching career
In 1998, Hutson got his coaching start at his alma mater as an assistant coach for two seasons before moving on to become the head boys' basketball coach at Bakersfield HS from 2000 to 2004. He returned to the college ranks for a one-year stop at Cal Poly as an assistant coach before landing on Steve Fisher's staff at San Diego State in 2006. Hutson would stay in the position until 2011, when he accepted an assistant coaching position at UNLV on Dave Rice's staff.

In 2013, Hutson would return to San Diego State as an assistant until April 5, 2018 when he was named the 21st head coach in Fresno State history, replacing Rodney Terry, who departed for the head coaching position at UTEP.

Head coaching record

College

References

1971 births
Living people
American men's basketball coaches
American men's basketball players
Bakersfield Renegades men's basketball players
Basketball coaches from California
Basketball players from Bakersfield, California
Cal Poly Mustangs men's basketball coaches
Cal State Bakersfield Roadrunners men's basketball coaches
Cal State Bakersfield Roadrunners men's basketball players
College men's basketball head coaches in the United States
Fresno State Bulldogs men's basketball coaches
High school basketball coaches in the United States
San Diego State Aztecs men's basketball coaches
UNLV Runnin' Rebels basketball coaches
Ventura Pirates men's basketball players